Asia Pacific Flight Training Sdn. Bhd. (APFT), is a flying academy located at the Sultan Ismail Petra Airport, Kota Bharu, Kelantan, Malaysia.

APFT offers courses leading to the airplane private, commercial and airline transport pilot licences and multi-engine, instrument and assistant flight instructor ratings. The school also offers a Diploma in Aviation (Pilot Training), which is approved by the Malaysian Qualifications Agency.

History
The school started training students in 2005 and was officially opened in 2006. It is the first Malaysian flight school to be accredited as a "private institution of higher learning". The school has a fleet of over 30 aircraft. It trains pilots for Malaysian Airlines, Nepal Airlines and Garuda Airlines.

In 2009, the school fleet consisted of the Diamond DA-40, Diamond DA-42, Eagle Aircraft 150B, Piper PA-28 Warrior and the Piper PA-34 Seneca, plus an AL200MCC simulator.

References

External links

Official website

Flight training
Aviation schools
Aviation schools in Malaysia